Arastra Creek may refer to:

Arastra Creek (Alaska), in Juneau, Alaska
Arastra Creek (California), in Siskiyou County, California
Arastra Creek (Montana), in Ravalli County, Montana